Pachytriton xanthospilos is a species of salamander in the family Salamandridae from Guangdong and Guangxi in southern China.

References

xanthospilos